Richard Clemont Harvey (born September 11, 1966) is a former American football linebacker in the National Football League.

Playing career

NFL playing career
Harvey played for the New England Patriots (1990-1991), the Buffalo Bills (1992-1993), the Denver Broncos (1994), the New Orleans Saints (1995-1997), the Oakland Raiders (1998-1999), and the San Diego Chargers (2000).  He played college football at Tulane University.

External links
NFL.com player page

1966 births
Living people
People from Pascagoula, Mississippi
Players of American football from Mississippi
American football linebackers
Tulane Green Wave football players
New England Patriots players
Buffalo Bills players
Denver Broncos players
New Orleans Saints players
Oakland Raiders players
San Diego Chargers players